Bagauda is a genus of thread-legged bug in the Emesinae. 18 species are currently known. Many of the species of this genus are associated with caves, some exclusively so. Bagauda is synonymous with the genus Pleias Kirkaldy, 1901, but Bagauda has become more widely used. The genus is restricted to Old World tropics.

Partial species list
Bagauda adami
Bagauda aelleni
Bagauda cavernìcola
Bagauda ernstmayri Kulkarni & Ghate, 2016
Bagauda furcosus
Bagauda lucifugus
Bagauda smithersi
Bagauda tenebricolus
Bagauda zigzag Rédei & Tsai, 2010
Bagauda zetteli

References

Reduviidae
Cimicomorpha genera
Taxa named by Ernst Evald Bergroth